Aveling and Porter was a British agricultural engine and steamroller (road roller) manufacturer.  Thomas Aveling and Richard Thomas Porter entered into partnership in 1862, and developed a steam engine three years later in 1865.  By the early 1900s, the company had become the largest manufacturer of steamrollers (road rollers) in the world. The company used a rampant horse as its logo derived from the White Horse of Kent.

Partners

Thomas Aveling
Thomas Aveling was born 11 September 1824 at Elm, Cambridgeshire.  His mother was widowed while Aveling was still young and the family settled in Hoo (Rochester, Kent).  His mother remarried to the Rev. John D'Urban of Hoo.  Thomas' stepfather brought him up with "a Bible in one hand and a birch rod in the other".  Aveling was apprenticed to Edward Lake, a farmer, of Hoo.  Aveling married Edward's niece, Sarah Lake (daughter of Robert Lake of Milton-Chapel near Canterbury) and in 1850 took a farm at Ruckinge on Romney Marsh.  In 1851 he was recorded as a farmer and grazier employing 16 men and 6 boys.  The business also included a drainage tile works. In 1859, Aveling invented the traction engine when he modified a Clayton & Shuttleworth portable engine, which had to be hauled from job to job by horses, into a self-propelled one. The alteration was made by fitting a long driving chain between the crankshaft and the rear axle. Aveling later invented the steamroller in 1867. Thomas Aveling is regarded as "the father of the traction engine".

Aveling had a reputation as something of a martinet in business, only keeping on the best men.  However, he did provide his staff with recreational facilities with a lecture room and mess room.  Lectures were delivered on educational, social and political topics with Aveling himself in the chair and participation from the floor encouraged.

Following the success of the Aveling and Porter business, Thomas rose to local prominence, first on the council and then between 1869 and 1870 as Mayor of Rochester.  Politically he held rather radical views within the Liberal Party.  Not surprisingly (given the location of the Invicta Works) he was a strong advocate of improving the river bank at Strood, which was at that time marsh.  As mayor he took an interest in the significant local charity Watts' Charity and was appointed to the board of trustees in 1871.  He helped lay out the public gardens in Rochester Castle, sat on the Rochester School Board and was a governor of the Sir Joseph Williamson's Mathematical School.

He was a member of the Royal Agricultural Society of England, serving as councilman 1875–1882 and on various committees.  He secured the building of a chemical laboratory for the society.  He was a member of the Institution of Civil Engineers, the Institution of Mechanical Engineers and the Iron and Steel Institute.

Aveling enjoyed yachting and had his own 28-ton yacht Sally.  He was active in the management of several yacht clubs including the Royal Cinque Ports and the Royal Victoria. After contracting a chill on board her in late February 1882 he developed pneumonia and died on 7 March 1882. Aveling is buried at St Werburgh Church, Hoo.

There is a secondary school in Rochester, Kent named after him called The Thomas Aveling School.

Thomas Lake Aveling
Aveling was the son of Thomas Aveling and his wife, Sarah.  He was born on 25 August 1856 in Ruckinge, Kent.  When he left school he worked for his father, taking control of Aveling & Porter in 1881.  After conversion to a limited liability company in 1895 he became its chairman and managing director until he retired.  In 1890 he married Richard Porter's niece, Rosita Marian Porter (1865—1904) daughter of Arthur Porter, manufacturing stationer, and his wife born Anna Maria Atkin. They had two sons, Thomas (1892-1982) and Arthur Francis (1893-1954).

As a prominent local businessman Aveling served on a number of public bodies.  He was chairman of the Medway Conservancy, on the board of the Rochester Bridge wardens, and a Justice of the Peace.  Like his father he was a member of the ICE and IME and RASE.  He was president both of the Smithfield Club and the Agricultural Engineers Association.  He was on the board of the Maidstone manufacturers of steam wagons Jesse Ellis Ltd.  In 1899 he had a  steam yacht built by Ramage & Ferguson.

Aveling retired from Aveling and Porter in 1928 and died of a heart attack on 5 June 1931 at home in Pettings Court, Ash near Wrotham, Kent.

Major Thomas Aveling MC
Major Aveling was the son of T.L.Aveling and therefore the grandson of the founder.  He was born on 20 January 1892 and during the First World War rose to the rank of Major.  He was awarded the Military Cross in 1917.

Major Aveling became a director of A and GE, taking control of Aveling & Porter on his father's retirement in 1928.

Richard Thomas Porter
Richard Porter's grandfather John (1736–1812) established a grocery business in Sheffield, Yorkshire.  His son Thomas married Ann Girdler and they had Richard in around 1835.  By 1861 Richard had moved to Enfield, London where he married Marianne Atkin (b. 1840) who had also been born in Sheffield.

In 1862 he went into partnership with Thomas Aveling and subsequently moved to Rochester where in around 1863 he had his first child, Edith.  1871 he is recorded as living at Boley Hill House with his wife, four children and four servants.  His occupation is recorded in the census as "Manufacturing Engineer".

Ten year later in 1881 the census locates him at Raleigh, Fox Grove Road, Beckenham with the family and servants as before plus his widowed sister-in-law Mary Studer.  He remained in Beckenham, the house being recorded as 26, Foxgrove Road after 1901.  He died in 1913.  His will was proven the following year when he was shown as "Engineer and Chairman of Aveling and Porter".

Business

Thomas Aveling, "Ironfounder and Agricultural Engineer"

With help from his father-in-law he was able in either 1850 or 1851 to buy a small millwrighting business at Edward's Yard, Rochester.  The business produced and repaired agricultural machinery.  Aveling had been concerned by the slow pace of agricultural labour arising from the "ancient and defective construction" of the machines.  Starting from 1852 he concentrated on experiments in steam cultivation, culminating in the first steam plough in 1856.  So successful was the plough that some Kent farmers presented him with an award of 300 guineas in 1858.

In 1858 Aveling had three premises: 24, High Street, Rochester; 27, Edwards Yard, Rochester; and a small foundry on the site of the future Invicta Works in Strood.

To a man such as Aveling the spectacle of portable engines being dragged around by teams of horses when the engines had more than sufficient power to move themselves seemed nonsensical.  He compared using six horses to pull such an engine as "six sailing vessels towing a steamer" which was "an insult to mechanical science".  In 1858 he adapted Clayton, Shuttleworth & Co portables by attaching a chain from the flywheel to a cog on a rear wheel.  In the following year he obtained a patent for this which included the specification for devices for varying the tension in the chain and for disengaging it "so that a traction engine can be used as a stationary portable engine at will".  His foundry and other premises were too small for the construction of a complete traction engine, so the 1859 locomotive was built for him by Claytons.

His 1860 catalogue describes him as an "Iron Founder and Agricultural Engineer".  He was the sole agent in Kent for Fowler's Steam Plough, for Burgess & Key's Patent Reaping Machines.  He was an agent (though not apparently sole agent) for Claytons.  The front page offers "Every description of Agricultural Machinery supplied at Manufacturer's Prices" and ends with "Castings to order", "Machinery and Steam Engines repaired".  Inside was "Aveling's Patent Locomotive Steam Thrashing Train" with engine, threshing machine and straw carrier.  Not withstanding his claims as an iron founder, this was made for him by Claytons.

Having solved the propulsion issue, Aveling next turned to steering.  His first engines had required a horse in shafts attached to the front wheels for steerage.  In 1860 he replaced the horse with a steerable wheel in between the horse shafts.  The steersman sat on the back of the shafts and operated a tiller to turn the wheel.

In 1860, the business moved to Strood, on a site adjacent to Rochester Bridge.  Preston reports the business as being established by 1861 at which time Aveling was able to build -ton engines.

Aveling and Porter up to 1881

With all this expansion Aveling needed extra capital, and so in 1862 he went into partnership with Richard Porter to create the firm of Aveling & Porter.  As well as the capital, Aveling was freed of some of the commercial work.

The firm exhibited their Patent Agricultural Locomotive Engine for Threshing, Ploughing and General Traction Purposes at Battersea in 1862.  Aveling moved the cylinder forward from over the firebox to the front of the boiler.  The steam jacket that surrounds the cylinders did away with the need for a separate dome (the patent stated that the cylinders were placed within the dome).  The jacket reduced condensation, and hence priming, in the cylinders, valve gear and now non-existent supply piping.  Ports between the jacket and boiler communicated live steam.  The crankshaft was now close to the wheels and the long chain could be first shortened, then disposed of in favour of gears.  In 1863 Aveling patented two-speed gearing.  Exports at this period were to Prussia and Australia.

Testing traction engines was a public affair, one was tested by driving it through Rochester to the station and back, another by driving it up Frindsbury hill. The local public turned out to see such trials and according to the Chatham News of August 1862 they were "well pleased and altogether favourably impressed". Whilst the local public might have been impressed, more generally opposition to road locomotives was building. To enforce the speeds a man had to walk in front carrying a red flag to warn bystanders.

Aveling pursued his interest in steamrollers, producing the first practical example in 1865. It was tested in Military Road, Chatham, Star Hill in Rochester and in Hyde Park, London. The machine proved a huge success. Aveling and Porter steam rollers were exported to Europe and as far afield as India and North America.

Starting in 1868 Aveling & Porter started to supply the government with road locomotives, traction engines and rollers. Up until 1894 they were known as Steam Sappers, since they were built to requirements issues by the Royal Engineers (the Sappers). In 1875, the French government conducted trials of steam sappers and were satisfied enough to order some; subsequently the Russian government conducted extensive trials in 1876 involving soft ground, steep inclines and tests of the ability of a train to be safely brought down hill. The test engine was fitted with a wire cable by which guns could be pulled up hill. Several engines were subsequently purchased and gave satisfactory service in the Russo-Turkish war. Sappers were also sold to Italy.

Technical innovation continued. Unlike railway locomotives where equipment is mounted on a frame, traction engines use the boiler as the frame. This cuts down on weight but introduces stresses and holes for the rivets which could be a source of leaks or failures. In 1870 Aveling introduced horn plates which were extensions of the outer firebox and which carried all the motion, cranks and gearing. Preston regards this as one of Aveling's most important inventions. Also in 1870 he took out a patent on a simplified reversing gear. Eight years later he managed to move the gears between the bearings, not overhanging. The resultant motion was stronger and narrower allowing a more compact engine.

At the Royal Agricultural Society of England (RASE) meeting at Leicester in 1868 Aveling showed "Little Tom", a small engine fitted with a crane. By 1874 the catalogue listed a 2-ton crane engine with a rear differential to permit tight cornering without disconnecting either wheel.

On the 1873 Vienna World's Fair Aveling & Porter were awarded prize medals for their steam-rollers. Also a crane version was to be seen and used for the erection of buildings of Vienna Exposition. In 1874 the Scientific American reported about successful "Improved Road and Farm Locomotive".

Aveling and Porter after 1881
In 1881 Thomas' son, Thomas Lake Aveling, took over control of the business.  Writing in 1899 Henry Smetham commented that the business had "doubled in size about every six years".  Employee headcount rose from 400 in 1872 to 1,000 in the mid-1890s and peaked at 1,500.
A new office block was built in 1886, which subsequently housed the drawing office.  The adjacent foundry business of Messrs Collis and Stace was purchased in 1895 along with the Pelican Yard.  Avelings were now making cement manufacturing machinery (including concrete mixers), lamp posts and girders, the latter of which can be seen in the roof of the covered slip at Chatham Historic Dockyard.  In the same year the company was incorporated as a limited company.  In 1899 Avelings turned out "one large road engine per day", paid £70,000 pa in wages locally using "220 lathes and other tools".  In common with most engineering works Avelings made a lot of their own machine tools themselves.  However, in 1900 the Public Health Engineer magazine stated that "modern American machinery is rapidly replacing the older forms of lathes and shaping and planing machines".

In 1901 Aveling took part in a joint venture with Vickers Sons and Maxim to build a steel casting facility.  Details were finalised and the plant constructed the following year.  By 1903 Vickers were reporting poor results due to insufficient orders (in particular field guns) and in March 1904 pulled out, the works subsequently closing in October 1904.  A 21-year lease to William Towler (trading as the Medway Steel Company) followed but then the works finally closed.

In the years prior to the First World War the Pelican Yard was built up and used for the assembly and testing of petrol engines for rollers and lorries.  On the outbreak of war petrol work stopped and the works were used as a store.  Although concentrating on steam rollers (for which there was an expanding market), the company also made traction engines, ploughing engines, steam wagons and tramway locomotives.  Other agricultural products were contracted out.  In the early twentieth century Aveling & Porter were supplying about 70% of the British market for road rollers.

Agricultural & General Engineers
In 1919 Aveling and Porter joined the Agricultural & General Engineers (AGE) combine. The combine had been formed at the joint instigation of T.L.Aveling and Archibald Maconochie.  As well as Aveling & Porter, AGE took over James and Frederick Howard Ltd and twelve other companies. Production of Aveling and Porter steam wagons was transferred to Richard Garrett & Sons.

The holding company's overheads exceeded any savings of scale.  The combine started to drag down A&P, and by 1928 headcount was down and short-time working had been implemented.   In 1932 AGE went into receivership, bringing down Aveling and Porter with it.  In the aftermath Aveling and Porter combined with Barford & Perkins in 1933 to form Aveling-Barford which continued to make steam and motor rollers. The rescue, part-funded by Ruston & Hornsby of Lincoln, involved the firm moving to Grantham, Lincolnshire, from the Rochester site.  After the Second World War the company continued to make motor and steam rollers as well as expanding into other construction equipment.

The sole remaining building on the Strood site was demolished by Medway Council in 2010.

Aveling-Barford is now part of the Wordsworth Holdings Group, a family-owned company. The company is based in Grantham,  and still trades under the name Barford which uses a modern version of the Aveling-Barford "prancing horse" logo. Barford manufacturers and sells a wide range of site dumpers.

Products
Aveling & Porter built more steam rollers than all the other British manufacturers combined. They also built traction engines and steam wagons. Just under 600 of the company’s various steam engines survived to enter preservation.

The company also built a few pairs of ploughing engines. A pair of which (unique in the UK) survive in the collection at the Thursford Steam Museum at Thursford, Norfolk. The Thursford Collection includes 27 Aveling & Porter steam tractors and rollers and 16 more by other manufacturers.

Another example of Aveling and Porters engineering skills can be seen in the massive covered slips at Chatham Dockyard. These Leviathans pre-date the great London train sheds of St. Pancras, King's Cross and Paddington—traditionally understood to be the oldest and largest metal framed structures of the time.

Locomotives
Aveling & Porter built several small shunting / tram locos based on their traction engines. They were basically traction engines with flanged wheels and no steering. Their advantages were that they were cheap to manufacture (and to design in the first place) and they could be operated with minimal training by someone who was familiar with traction engines.

Steam Sappers

Prior to 1868 the Royal Engineers had been experimenting with steam traction.  Early examples had used modified railway locomotives mounted on a variety of wheels to traverse soft land.  The locomotives were far too heavy to be effective, on one occasion breaking through the road near the Royal Arsenal at Woolwich into cellars below.  With the development of the relatively lightweight traction engine specifically for road use, the Royal Engineers turned their attention to them.

The first Steam Sapper was ordered from Aveling & Porter in 1868.  Steam sapper number 1 was required to operate a  circular saw, grindstone, lathe and joiner as well as drawing 5 tons up a 1 in 12 slope.  It performed this, but was more than a quarter of a ton over the specified maximum weight of five tons.  The heaviest field gun in use at that time was the 64 pdr Armstrong breech loading siege gun weighing .  Since pontoon bridges would be constructed to support this gun, steam sappers were required to weigh less than the gun so that they would not overload the bridges.  Steam sapper number one had a loading on the rear wheels less than this, and so was accepted.

During 1869 military exercises in Dover included drawing a battery of guns from the railway station up to the castle, a high, steep hill. In September 1870 the 4 wheels (3 ft 6in front, and 5 ft rear) were fitted with bolted on steel and india rubber blocks (L. Sterne & Co Patent), and on 23 September it was subject to another successful trial. Towing a total of 13 tons on two "lorries" (trailers), it left the Rochester works, ascending the  1 in 12 Star Hill, and delivering the load to Chatham dockyard where it was driven across rough ground of cinder, bricks, clinker, stones and iron designed to test the rubber blocks. In a further trial in October it drew 3 "trollies" weighing in total 16 tons 16 cwt up Star-Hill (part of which was 1 in 11 slope), including stopping and making a complete turn on the steepest part of the hill in a circle of 23 feet. It then proceeded to 1 in 10 Chatham Hill which was described as slippery, and it had to detach the last trailer, and ascended towing the other two (12 tons 6 cwt). It was then tested on soft ground, where it drew trucks up to 6 tons, where a normal traction engine got stuck without a truck, and then after bolting paddles on the wheels it towed the normal traction engine out.

Steam sapper number 2 was purchased in 1871.  This was a lighter and more powerful engine than number one.  The engine was rated 7 nhp (compared to 6), used spur gears for the drive (compared to chain) and used a differential drive on the rear axle to avoid the need to disconnect one wheel which the earlier locomotive had required.  On test it drew  up the 1 in 11 gradient of Star Hill, Rochester.

In late 1871 the Inspector General of Fortifications was informed by the RE Committee that only Aveling and Porter had a suitable engine.  As a result, five more were ordered in 1872.

Some of the steam sappers were fitted with railway wheels.  Yeatman records steam sappers numbers 3–7 as being 2-2-0T locomotives on the Lodge Hill and Upnor Railway. Yeatman's editor, Mullett and Nowers disagree. Aveling-Barford have checked their records and have no records of any steam sappers being supplied other than for road use.  Nowers states that sapper number 9 was fitted with railway wheels for a trial and that sapper number 12 was purchased with them.  In 1873, in preparations for the Ashantee expedition, it is recorded "A second locomotive, called a steam sapper, arrived at Woolwich yesterday from Chatham, accompanied by several waggons to form a train, either for running upon rails or common roads, both engine and waggons being provided with flanged wheels for use if necessary". One of the two steam sappers planned to go to Ashanti was not shipped, and in October 1874 there is an account of a steam sapper propelling three "Ashentee" rail trucks containing dignitaries during an artillery demonstration in Eastbourne. In the table below possible railway use is recorded, in most cases this would be upon the LH&UR.

Sapper number 8 was dismantled and sent in parts to Cape Coast Castle in the Gold Coast to take part in the Ashanti Campaign of 1873.  The absence of decent roads made its use as a traction engine unsatisfactory.  However it performed well as a stationary engine, particularly working the saw bench.

Sapper number 24 was the last Aveling and Porter engine to be called a steam sapper.  It was used by the newly formed Balloon Corps in 1885.  The locomotive and another one ordered shortly afterwards were used to haul "balloon trains".  Each train consisted of five wagons carrying gas cylinders, a water cart, and a wagon for the balloon, basket and winch.  Balloons were normally employed as elevated observation platforms and as such were tethered though observers were trained in how to handle free flight in case the balloon broke away.

Aveling and Porter engines continued to be purchased up to 1899 though losing ground to Fowlers.  At least one engine saw service in the Boer War and four were still in service in 1906 with the Army Service Corps which progressively took over responsibility for transport from the Royal Engineers between 1903 and 1906.

In fiction
Two Aveling and Porter products are found in The Railway Series books by the Rev. W. Awdry and the TV series based on the books: George the Steamroller, and Fergus the Railway Traction Engine.

The road roller used in the 1953 comedy film The Titfield Thunderbolt, which has a duel with a railway locomotive, was one of their engines (works number 5590, Maid Marion).

Notes

References
 
 .  Online entry includes "Thomas Lake Aveling(1856–1931)" on the same page.  See 
 .  The BRC appears to be the trading arm of the QRS.

External links

Industrial Railway Society article on Aveling & Porter industrial locomotives
 A Steam Dinosaur Description of the finding and identification of engine 235.

Manufacturing companies established in 1862
Agricultural machinery manufacturers of the United Kingdom
Defunct manufacturing companies of the United Kingdom
Locomotive manufacturers of the United Kingdom
Steam wagon manufacturers
Steam road vehicle manufacturers
Companies based in Kent
1862 establishments in England